Kim Jong-su is a North Korean former footballer. He represented North Korea on at least six occasions between 1985 and 1998.

Career statistics

International

References

Date of birth unknown
Living people
North Korean footballers
North Korea international footballers
Association football midfielders
Year of birth missing (living people)